Dan Heefner is an American college baseball coach who has been the head coach of Dallas Baptist since the start of the 2008 season.  Under Heefner, the Patriots have reached ten NCAA Tournaments, including a Super Regional in 2011.  An Olivet Nazarene graduate, Heefner played two years of baseball for the Tigers after transferring from Northern Iowa.

Coaching career

Northern Iowa
Heefner began his coaching career at Northern Iowa (UNI), where he worked under head coach Rick Heller from 2002 to 2003.  The Panthers had a 30-win season in 2003 and made the MVC Tournament in both seasons.  Heefner earned his master's degree from the university in 2003.

Creighton
After UNI, Heefner spent the 2004 at Creighton under head coach Ed Servais.  In Servais' first season as head coach, the team went 35–24 and finished second in the MVC.

Dallas Baptist
Heefner was named an assistant at independent Dallas Baptist under Eric Newman for the 2005 season.  When Newman left to become an assistant at Nebraska after the 2007 season, Heefner was promoted to head coach.

In his first season as head coach, 2008, the Patriots qualified for their first NCAA Tournament with a 37–17 regular season.  They were the first independent other than Miami (FL) to do so since Cal State Northridge in 1992.  As the second seed at the Houston Regional, they went 0–2, losing 9–5 games to Houston and Illinois–Chicago.

The Patriots again made NCAA Tournament in 2011 and 2012, both 40-win seasons. They made their deepest run in 2011. As the third seed in the Fort Worth Regional, the team won its opening games against Oklahoma and host TCU to advance to the regional finals. There, it dropped its first game against Oral Roberts but defeated the Eagles in a decisive game seven to advance to the Super Regionals against fellow three seed California.  There, the Patriots were swept in two games.

After playing in the Western Athletic Conference in 2013, Dallas Baptist reached the NCAA Tournament in 2014, its first season in the Missouri Valley Conference.  It went 36–18 (14–7 MVC) in the regular season, tying for second in the conference.  It won the MVC Tournament, defeating Illinois State in the title game.  The Patriots then went 0–2 at the Fort Worth Regional.

Head coaching record
Below is a table of Heefner's yearly records as a collegiate head baseball coach.

See also
 List of current NCAA Division I baseball coaches

References

Living people
Creighton Bluejays baseball coaches
Dallas Baptist Patriots baseball coaches
Northern Iowa Panthers baseball coaches
Northern Iowa Panthers baseball players
Olivet Nazarene Tigers baseball players
University of Northern Iowa alumni
Year of birth missing (living people)